Palma Island (Isla Palma) is a coral island located in the Archipelago of San Bernardo, Gulf of Morrosquillo, Caribbean Sea. It is governed by Colombia, and is a part of the Colombian Bolívar Department.

Lodging facilities are present on the island.

See also
 Caribbean region of Colombia
 Insular region of Colombia
 List of islands of South America

References

Caribbean islands of Colombia